Outhwaite is a surname of English origin and may refer to:

People
 Outhwaite Family, Auckland, a pioneer family in Auckland, New Zealand
 Tamzin Outhwaite (born 1970), British television actor
 Ida Rentoul Outhwaite (1888–1960), Australian artist and book illustrator
 Joseph H. Outhwaite (1841–1907), American lawyer and politician
 R. L. Outhwaite (1868–1930), English Liberal politician
 Sarah Tait (née Outhwaite; 1983–2016), Australian rower

Places
 Outhwaite Homes, a public housing development in Cleveland, Ohio